Jovan Bijelić ( ( – 12 March 1964) was a painter and academic. Bijelić is one of the most important representatives of color expressionism in Yugoslavia.

The Department of Fine Arts and Music of the Serbian Academy of Sciences in Belgrade elected Bijelić as a full member on 5 December 1963.

Bijelić is included on The 100 most prominent Serbs list.

Gallery

References

Serbian painters
1964 deaths
Year of birth uncertain
People from Bosanski Petrovac
Serbs of Bosnia and Herzegovina